Boondooma is a rural locality in the South Burnett Region, Queensland, Australia.

Geography 
The Boondooma Dam and its associated lake is on south-eastern boundary between Boondooma and Okeden.

History 
Durong Provisional School opened on 3 September 1923. On 7 November 1927 it became Durong State School. The school closed briefly in 1928 due to low student numbers.

Boondooma State School opened on 1939 and closed on 3 May 1968. It was on Brownless Road.

The closure of Boondooma State School enabled Durong State School to be renamed Boondooma State School in 1970. It closed in December 1999. The school was at 9359 Mundubbera Durong Road. It is now the Old Boondooma School Community Centre.

Heritage listings 
Boondooma has a number of heritage-listed sites, including:
 Boondooma Homestead: Mundubbera-Durong Road

Education 
There are no schools in Boondooma. The nearest government primary schools are Durong South State School in neighbouring Durong to the south and Monogorilby State School in neighbouring Monogorilby to the north-west. The nearest government secondary school is Proston State School (to Year 10) in Proston to the east. There is no nearby secondary education to Year 12; distance education and boarding schools are options.

References

External links 

South Burnett Region
Localities in Queensland